The Beth Chatto Gardens, now known as Beth Chatto's Plants & Gardens, are an informal collection of historically significant gardens, with National Heritage Grade II listing. The ecological gardens were created by plantswoman Beth Chatto in 1960 from the gravel soil and bogs of the disused fruit farm belonging to her husband, botanist Andrew Chatto. They are a series of gardens that display examples of sustainable planting based on Beth Chatto's ethos of 'right plant, right place'.

Plant nursery

The plant nursery on the Chatto land is run by Beth Chatto's propagation team and produces around 100,000 plants each year, most propagated from plants Chatto collected, and grown on site in peat-free compost. Plants are sent out all over the UK.

Open to the public

Beth Chatto's Plants & Gardens is a family business, run by Beth Chatto's granddaughter Julia Boulton.The online nursery is open all year around. The gardens and are open to the public seasonally. Chatto lived in the white house that remains overlooking the Water Garden. She was often seen about the gardens and up until her death in May 2018 at the age of 94. The gardens are managed by director David Ward and head gardener Asa Gregers-Warg.

References

Sources
 Buchan, Ursula. Gravel allure. The Spectator, 18 November 2000 (retrieved 14 May 2008)
 Clayton, Phil, and Hepworth, Neil. "Beth Chatto Gardens" in The Garden. RHS, September 2015, pp. 46–52
 Stocken, Nicola. "By way of an introduction" in The Garden. RHS, September 2015, pp. 54–55

External links
Official site

Gardens in Essex